The Battle of San Jacinto was a battle during the Philippine–American War fought on November 11, 1899, in San Jacinto, Pangasinan, Philippines, between the Filipinos and the United States.

Background
During the fall of 1899, General Elwell S. Otis began a three-pronged offensive against the Filipinos north of Manila. General Arthur MacArthur's 2nd Division was moving north along the railroad running out of Manila, General Henry W. Lawton's 1st Division moved up the Pampanga River against San Isidro. The third expedition would be led by General Loyd Wheaton, commander of the 1st Brigade, 2nd Division. Wheaton's brigade was detached and landed at San Fabian on Lingayen Gulf. After landing on 7 Nov., Wheaton sent out patrols to the south and west towards Dagupan.

Brig. Gen. Manuel Tinio's 1,200 brigade had established his headquarters in San Jacinto in early November, building barricaded, trenches and obstacles.

Battle
The 33rd U.S. Volunteer Infantry's advance company were ambushed on the road to San Jacinto, forcing them to the muddy rice fields to the right and Major Peyton C. March's battalion to the left.  March's men were able to flank the Filipinos and entered the town, forcing the Tinio Brigade to retreat. 8 US soldiers were killed, including Major John Alexander Logan, Jr.

Aftermath
Wheaton and MacArthur's forces joined on the 26th at Mangatarem, Pangasinan, when the 36th Infantry joined Capt. Godfrey Fowler's Company F, 33rd Infantry.  Fowler had earlier forced Brig. Gen. Jose Alejandrino's 500-1000 troops to abandon their artillery, supplies and 100 Spanish prisoners.

References

See also
Campaigns of the Philippine–American War

Battle of San Jacinto (1899)
Battle of San Jacinto (1899)
Battles of the Philippine–American War
Battle of San Jacinto (1899)
November 1899 events